The 1937 New Year Honours in New Zealand were appointments by King George VI to various orders and honours to reward and highlight good works by New Zealanders. The awards celebrated the passing of 1936 and the beginning of 1937. This was the first honours list of George VI's reign, and its announcement was deferred until 1 February 1937.

The recipients of honours are displayed here as they were styled before their new honour.

Knight Bachelor
 George Harper  – chairman of the Metropolitan Relief Committee, Christchurch.
 George Alexander Troup  – of Wellington. For public services.

Order of Saint Michael and Saint George

Companion (CMG)
 Professor Hugh Mackenzie  – foundation professor of English language and literature, Victoria University College, Wellington.

Order of the British Empire

Commander (CBE)
Civil division
 Joseph William Allan Heenan  – of Wellington; under-secretary, Department of Internal Affairs.

Military division
 Captain Llewellyn Vaughan Morgan  – Royal Navy; formerly second naval member of the New Zealand Naval Board.

Officer (OBE)
Civil division
 Anna Elizabeth Jerome Spencer – of Omatua, Rissington, Hawke's Bay; founder of the Women's Institute and the Townswomen's Guild movements in New Zealand. For social-welfare services.
 Eileen May Duggan  – of Wellington. For contributions to literature.

Member (MBE)
Civil division
 Richard Brown  – formerly secretary, Wellington Hospital Board.
 Harold Archibald Sommerville – secretary, Auckland Hospital Board.
 William Shakespear Wharton  – secretary, North Canterbury Hospital Board, Christchurch.

References

New Year Honours
1937 awards
1937 in New Zealand
New Zealand awards